Mutyala Saralu (Telugu: ముత్యాల సరాలు) is a compilation of Telugu poems written by Gurajada Apparao in 1910. This has heralded the beginning of modern poetry in Telugu language. The traditional meter is replaced by a new lyrical and four beat balladic rhythm. These poems reflected the general social transformation in India.

Compilation
 Mutyala Saralu
 Deshabhakti including Desamunu Preminchumanna
 Kasulu
 Daman - Pithius
 Lavanaraju Dream
 Kanyaka
 Korukonda
 Poornamma
 Manishi
 Dinchu Langaru
 Langarettumu

Desamunu Preminchumanna

Desamunu Preminchumanna (Telugu: దేశమును ప్రేమించుమన్నా) is a Telugu patriotic song written by Mahakavi Gurazada Apparao. The song has inspired many Indians to dedicate their lives for the service of their Nation.

The Song
<poem>
desamunu preminchumanna,
manchi annadi penchumanna,
votti maatalu kattipettoy,
gattimel thalapettavoy.

desamante matti kaadhoyi,
desamante manushuloyi</poem>

Meaning: A country is not made of land; a country is made of its people.Film

Some portion of the Desamunu Preminchumanna song is incorporated in the 1954 Telugu film Jyoti'' starring Savitri and G. Varalakshmi. The song has the voice of G. Varalakshmi.

Complete Song
 Complete poem in Telugu Wikisource at :s:te:దేశమును ప్రేమించుమన్నా

Poornamma
Poornamma or Purnamma (Telugu: పూర్ణమ్మ) song is written by Gurajada Apparao in 1912. Ghantasala composed music and sang this popular song.

The Song
melimi bangaru melatallara
kaluvala kannula kannellara
tallulaganna pillallara
vinnaramma ee kathanu.

aatala paatala petikalara
kammani matala kommallara
ammalaganna ammallara
vinnaramma ee kathanu.

kannula kanthulu kaluvala cherenu
melimi jerenu meni pasal
hamsala jerenu nadakala bedagulu
durganu cherenu poornamma.

Complete song
 Complete poem in Telugu Wikisource at :s:te:పూర్ణమ్మ

References

External links
Anthology of poems written by Gurajada Apparao 

Telugu-language songs
Telugu-language literature
1910 songs